A total lunar eclipse took place on Monday, November 29, 1993, the second of two total lunar eclipses in 1993, the first was on Friday, June 4.

Visibility

Related eclipses

Eclipses of 1993 
 A partial solar eclipse (north) on May 21.
 A total lunar eclipse (central, passing north of the axis) on June 4.
 A partial solar eclipse (south) on November 13.
 A total lunar eclipse (south) on November 29.

Lunar year series

Half-Saros cycle
A lunar eclipse will be preceded and followed by solar eclipses by 9 years and 5.5 days (a half saros). This lunar eclipse is related to two total solar eclipses of Solar Saros 142.

See also 
List of lunar eclipses
List of 20th-century lunar eclipses

References

External links 
 Saros cycle 135
 
 

1993-11
1993 in science
November 1993 events